This is a list of all published and upcoming books in the Beast Quest series by Working Partners Limited. All books were written under the collective pen name Adam Blade, and the names of the ghostwriters are listed where known.

Beast Quest main series in order

Special Bumper Editions

Special of the World Book Day Special

Master Your Destiny series
The Master Your Destiny series is a series that lets the reader choose their own path, by turning to pages that decide a decision. Each book has ten different endings, eight of which are bad endings and two of which are the main endings. All three were written by the ghostwriter, Elizabeth Galloway.

Companion books

The Chronicles of Avantia series
The Chronicles of Avantia series is a set of four books that take place several hundred years before the events in Beast Quest.

Battle of the Beasts series
In the Battle of the Beasts series, the main protagonist, Tom, starts a training camp where he invites some people who have performed heroic acts to help protect Avantia from evil. Each book has a different hero who uses a different beast to defeat a controlled beast.

Sea Quest series
The Sea Quest series is a companion science fiction series that has a new protagonist who battles robotic creatures.

Sea Quest Specials

Team Hero series

Team Hero Specials

Beast Quest: New Blood

Space Wars

Beast Quest
Beast Quest
2000s books
Beast Quest